Adi Lev (August 20, 1953 – March 12, 2006) was an Israeli actress and voice actress.

Biography
Born in Romania, Lev emigrated to Israel with her family at 16 years of age. She studied acting at Tel Aviv University and Beit Zvi. She also went to an acting workshop in New York City in the 1970s. Upon her return to Israel, Lev began performing at the Habima Theatre and the Cameri Theatre where she starred in a theatre adaptation of Les Misérables. She also made a collaboration with director Sofia Moskowitz. On screen, Lev was known for working with Ze'ev Revach in many of his films and appearing in Broken Wings and The Rubber Merchants.

Since the late 1990s, Lev focused her attention to dubbing. She performed the Hebrew voices of Baba Yaga in Bartok the Magnificent, Roz in Monsters, Inc., Mrs. Hasagawa in Lilo & Stitch, Mrs. Tweedy in Chicken Run and Kala in Tarzan II.

Personal life
In 1981, Lev married Romanian musician Peter Wertheimer. They had two children, Alon and Shirley, who is also an actress.

Death
Lev died of cancer on March 12, 2006, at the age of 52 after being diagnosed the previous September. She was buried at the Old Cemetery of Herzliya.

References

External links

1953 births
2006 deaths
Beit Zvi School for the Performing Arts alumni
Deaths from cancer in Israel
Israeli film actresses
Jewish Israeli actresses
Israeli stage actresses
Israeli television actresses
Israeli voice actresses
Israeli people of Romanian-Jewish descent
Romanian emigrants to Israel
Romanian Jews in Israel
Tel Aviv University alumni
20th-century Israeli actresses
21st-century Israeli actresses